A customs declaration is a form that lists the details of goods that are being imported or exported when a citizen or visitor enters a customs territory (country's borders). Most countries require travellers to complete a customs declaration form when bringing notified goods (alcoholic drinks, tobacco products, animals, fresh food, plant material, seeds, soils, meats, and animal products) across international borders. Posting items via international mail also requires the sending party to complete a customs declaration form.

The declaration form helps the customs to control goods entering the country, which can affect the country's economy, security or environment. A levy duty may be applied.

Travellers have to declare everything they acquired abroad and possibly pay customs duty tax on goods. Some countries offer a duty-free allowance of certain products which may not need to be declared explicitly.

Types of forms

 When an individual is transporting the goods, the form is called a customs arrival card, or a landing card, or an entry voucher. The traveller is required to fill out the form, sign and submit to the customs or border protection officer before entering the country.
When an individual or an organization ships goods across the borders, one must use other customs declaration forms, such as a commercial invoice, or a proforma invoice, an import declaration form, an ATA Carnet, or a re-export declaration. Incoterms on these forms define the shipment and customs declaration. A Harmonized System Code (Hs code or harmonized code) might be required to define the type of goods and their associated tax rate. The importer is usually required to provide information about the goods' country of origin and the certificate of origin. Errors on the forms can cause delays or confiscation of the goods. For that reason, importers often use a customs brokerage to clear goods through customs.

Some nations require a customs declaration form from each person crossing the border, while other nations require one form per family traveling together. A family is usually defined as family members residing in the same household, who are related by marriage, adoption, blood, or domestic relationship.

Selected jurisdictions

Kuwait
The Kuwait Customs 
Alcohol of all kinds is forbidden to enter.
Materials containing packaging. In quantities. Will be considered commercial and require a temporary import license
Fees for commercial materials 5% 
Customs Broker https://www.eqab.net

Australia
The Department of Immigration and Border Protection handles the customs imports and exports of Australia. Incoming passengers are required to declare for inspection all food, plant material and animal products on arrival in Australia.

Canada
Customs declaration managed by the Canada Border Services Agency:
 Each Canadian resident returning to Canada can have a personal exception on goods and gifts purchased or received in another country. Personal exceptions are based on the length of the absence from the country. 24 hours, 48 hours, or 7 days. 
Alcohol limitations:  1.5 L of wine or 1.14 L of liquor or 24 x 355 mL cans or bottles (8.5 L) of beer or ale. (Must be of legal age in the province of importation.) Tobacco limitations, 200 cigarettes, 200 tobacco sticks, 50 cigars or cigarillos and 200 grams of manufactured tobacco (Special Duty may apply).
Each individual must declare travelling with $10,000 or more in cash.

China

General Administration of Customs handles the customs imports and exports for the Government of China.

European Union
The European Union's Directorate-General for Taxation and Customs Union is responsible for taxation and Customs Union matters. The European Union Customs Union regulates trade in the EU. The European Customs Information Portal is an importing and exporting service provided by the EU. Some territories within the EU do not participate in the customs union, usually as a result of their geographic circumstances. Through agreements, the EU has customs unions with Andorra, San Marino, and Turkey respectively, with the exceptions of certain goods.

Hong Kong
The Customs and Excise Department handles the customs imports and exports for Hong Kong.

India
The Central Board of Indirect Taxes and Customs handles the customs imports and exports of India.

Items prohibited for import:

 Maps and literature where Indian external boundaries have been shown incorrectly
 Narcotic drugs and psychotropic substances
 Goods violating any of the legally enforceable intellectual property rights
 Wildlife products
 Counterfeit currency notes/coin or fake currency notes
 Specified Live Birds and animals

Indonesia
The Directorate General of Customs and Excise handles the customs imports and exports of Indonesia.

New Zealand
The New Zealand Customs Service handles the customs imports and exports of New Zealand.

Pakistan
Pakistan Customs handles the customs imports and exports for Pakistan and control of the list of tariffs in Pakistan.

Philippines
The Bureau of Customs handles the customs imports and exports for Philippines.

Poland
The Customs Service of Poland handles the customs imports and exports for Poland

Russia
The Federal Customs Service of Russia handles the customs imports and exports for the Russia. Russian Customs Tariff cover the Federal Customs Service of Russia

Singapore
Singapore Customs handles the customs imports and exports for Singapore.

South Korea
Korea Customs Service handles the customs imports and exports for South Korea.

Sri Lanka
Sri Lanka Customs handles the customs imports and exports for Sri Lanka

Sweden
The Swedish Customs Service handles the customs imports and exports for Sweden.

United Kingdom

The UK Border Agency handles customs in the United Kingdom. The UK Border Agency works with HM Revenue and Customs. HMRC's Customs Declaration Service (CDS) is replacing the long-standing CHIEF system of customs declaration.

When the Northern Ireland Protocol comes into effect on 1 January 2021, the Customs Declaration Service will also be used for declarations on goods movements to or from Northern Ireland, including goods moving from Great Britain to Northern Ireland, but other customs declarations will continue to use CHIEF pending a longer-term move to the CDS. HMRC explains that "CHIEF is a reliable and robust platform" but "its age means it can’t easily keep pace with new technology".

United States

 U.S. Customs asks a Head of Household to complete the form (CBP Form 6059B ). Family members residing in the same household, who are related by marriage, adoption, blood, or domestic relationship, can use one form.
For returning U.S. residents: The personal duty exemption for each family member is $800.00. For example, a family of five members returning is allowed a combined personal duty exemption of $4,000 (calculated as $800 for each family member multiplied by 5).
 For international visitors: US laws allow visitors some exemptions, like tobacco, gifts, personal effects, etc. The head of a household can complete a form for a family. It is good to check the current duties and exemptions to avoid tax or loss of goods.
Anyone travelling with more than $10,000 must declare it.

 At some international airports, the US operates United States border preclearance stations, where U.S. Customs and Border Protection is done before boarding the international flight.
 If exporting goods that are valued more than $2,500, an extra form is required: the Electronic Export Information (EEI) form. The Automated Export System (AES) is the system used by U.S. exporters to electronically declare their international exports. This information is used by the Census Bureau to help compile U.S. export and trade statistics.

See also 

Airport check-in
Carnet de Passages en Douane
Customs valuation
Departure card
Duty-free shop
Electronic System for Travel Authorization
Free trade zone
Freight forwarder
Landing card
List of countries by imports
Migration card
NAFTA
Passport
Title 19 of the United States Code
Visa (document)

References

External links
U.S. Customs and Border Protection at cbp.gov 
U.S. The Department of Homeland Security at dhs.gov
US Coastguard at gocoastguard.com
Canada Border Services Agency at cbsa-asfc.gc.ca
Customs Declaration Form / Bill of Entry Export for South Africa
Customs, How to complete the customs declaration for Belize
 Customs Declaration for Japan
Japan customs declaration form

Gallery

Civil aviation
International trade documents